Davie Kemp is a Scottish retired Association football midfielder who played five seasons in the North American Soccer League and two in the Major Indoor Soccer League.

References

1950 births
Living people
Footballers from Dundee
Major Indoor Soccer League (1978–1992) players
North American Soccer League (1968–1984) players
North American Soccer League (1968–1984) indoor players
San Francisco Fog (MISL) players
San Jose Earthquakes (1974–1988) players
Scottish footballers
Scottish expatriate footballers
Golden Bay Earthquakes (MISL) players
Association football midfielders
Scottish expatriate sportspeople in the United States
Expatriate soccer players in the United States